Trigonectes is a genus of fish in the family Rivulidae. These annual killifish are endemic to the Paraguay, upper Madeira (Beni, Guaporé and Mamoré) and Tocantins basins in far northern Argentina, Bolivia, central Brazil and western Paraguay. They inhabit seasonal swamp, pools and similar habitats in open regions (for example, savanna). Once the water disappears, the adults die, but the eggs that have been laid in the bottom remain, only hatching after several months (up to a year) when the water returns.

Species
There are currently 6 species in this genus:

 Trigonectes aplocheiloides Huber, 1995
 Trigonectes balzanii (Perugia, 1891)
 Trigonectes macrophthalmus W. J. E. M. Costa, 1990
 Trigonectes rogoaguae (N. E. Pearson & G. S. Myers, 1924)
 Trigonectes rubromarginatus W. J. E. M. Costa, 1990
 Trigonectes strigabundus G. S. Myers, 1925

References

Rivulidae
Freshwater fish genera
Taxa named by George S. Myers